Conesville is a city in Muscatine County, Iowa, United States. The population was 352 at the 2020 census. It is part of the Muscatine Micropolitan Statistical Area.

History
Conesville was once a depot on the Burlington, Cedar Rapids and Northern Railway. It was named for Beebe Stewart Cone, a prosperous landowner. Beebe S. Cone had previously established himself as a co-owner of a distillery in Conesville, Ohio. The distillery burned down in 1857, but was not rebuilt by him. By 1870, Cone had established himself as a notable farmer in Orono Township in Muscatine County, Iowa.

Geography
Conesville is located at  (41.379323, -91.350211).

Demographics

2010 census
As of the census of 2010, there were 432 people, 132 households, and 105 families living in the city. The racial makeup of the city was 57.6% White, 0.7% African American, 1.6% Asian, 38.2% from other races, and 1.9% from two or more races. Hispanic or Latino of any race were 63.0% of the population.

There were 132 households, of which 52.3% had children under the age of 18 living with them, 50.0% were married couples living together, 15.9% had a female householder with no husband present, 13.6% had a male householder with no wife present, and 20.5% were non-families. 15.9% of all households were made up of individuals, and 6.1% had someone living alone who was 65 years of age or older. The average household size was 3.27 and the average family size was 3.66.

The median age in the city was 29 years. 35.9% of residents were under the age of 18; 9.2% were between the ages of 18 and 24; 30.6% were from 25 to 44; 16.7% were from 45 to 64; and 7.6% were 65 years of age or older. The gender makeup of the city was 52.3% male and 47.7% female.

2000 census
As of the census of 2000, there were 424 people, 133 households, and 100 families living in the city. The racial makeup of the city was 78.77% White, 0.24% Asian, 20.28% from other races, and 0.71% from two or more races. Hispanic or Latino of any race were 58.96% of the population.

There were 133 households, out of which 42.1% had children under the age of 18 living with them, 54.9% were married couples living together, 13.5% had a female householder with no husband present, and 24.1% were non-families. 18.8% of all households were made up of individuals, and 4.5% had someone living alone who was 65 years of age or older. The average household size was 3.19 and the average family size was 3.62.

In the city, the population was spread out, with 36.3% under the age of 18, 7.8% from 18 to 24, 33.3% from 25 to 44, 14.2% from 45 to 64, and 8.5% who were 65 years of age or older. The median age was 28 years. For every 100 females, there were 126.7 males. For every 100 females age 18 and over, there were 114.3 males.

The median income for a household in the city was $29,464, and the median income for a family was $30,000. Males had a median income of $28,000 versus $19,167 for females. The per capita income for the city was $10,097. About 11.1% of families and 13.9% of the population were below the poverty line, including 19.3% of those under age 18 and 4.9% of those age 65 or over.

References

Cities in Iowa
Cities in Muscatine County, Iowa
Muscatine, Iowa micropolitan area